James Maxwell Cooper (June 17, 1900 – November 29, 1979) was a Canadian politician, who represented the electoral district of Sudbury in the Legislative Assembly of Ontario from 1937 to 1943. He was a member of the Ontario Liberal Party. He was born in Sudbury.

While in the Legislature, he was one of six Northern Ontario MPPs who absented themselves from a vote to censure the federal government for "not prosecuting the war with sufficient diligence".

Following his time in politics, he became an investor in the city's media; with coinvestors George Miller and Bill Plaunt, he purchased the Sudbury Star and radio station CKSO in 1950, and launched CKSO-TV in 1953. He died at a nursing home in 1979.

References

External links 
Member's parliamentary history for the Legislative Assembly of Ontario

1900 births
1979 deaths
Ontario Liberal Party MPPs
Politicians from Greater Sudbury
Canadian television executives
Businesspeople from Greater Sudbury